San Francisco Comic Book was an underground comix anthology published between 1970 and 1983. Conceived of and edited by Gary Arlington, the anthology highlighted the work of many of San Francisco's top underground talents, including Bill Griffith, Robert Crumb, Kim Deitch, Justin Green, Rory Hayes, Willy Murphy, Jim Osborne, Trina Robbins, and Spain Rodriguez.

San Francisco Comic Book was the brainchild of Gary Arlington. Over the years the shaky finances of San Francisco Comic Book Company, required him to enlist the help of fellow Bay Area publishers Print Mint and Last Gasp in getting the book printed.

Publication history 
The first issue of San Francisco Comic Book was published by editor Arlington's own San Francisco Comic Book Company. Issues #2 and #3 were published by the Print Mint "for the San Francisco Comic Book Company". Issue #4 was published by the Print Mint.

After a seven-year hiatus, issue #5 was co-published by the Print Mint and Last Gasp (although it was still copyrighted by the San Francisco Comic Book Company). Issue #6 was "produced" by the San Francisco Comic Book Company and published by Last Gasp. Issue #7 was published by Last Gasp.

Overview 
Gary Arlington operated the San Francisco Comic Book Company as a retailer and soon enough a publisher. By late 1969, his store was a nexus for local underground talent, and San Francisco was well on its way to becoming a Mecca for underground cartoonists from all over the country. Arlington determined to publish an anthology showcasing the work of the local underground cartooning community, and thus was born San Francisco Comic Book.

Arlington recruited Don Donahue of Apex Novelties to co-edit the first issue of the anthology. The two publishers then recruited cartoonists Rory Hayes, Willy Murphy, Larry Welz, Jack Jackson, and Jim Osborne — all credited as co-editors — to bring in more talent. As a result, issue #1 featured work from four members of the Zap Comix crew: Crumb, S. Clay Wilson, Spain, and Rick Griffin.

Issue #4 featured contributions from three members of the Air Pirates collective: Bobby London, Gary Hallgren, and Ted Richards. The lead Air Pirates instigator, Dan O'Neill, had work in issues #1 and 2. That same issue featured an 8-page supplement called Dogbite Magazine with illustrations of vicious dogs by Spain Rodriguez, Roger Brand, Kim Deitch, Bill Griffith, Jay Lynch, Michael McMillan, Rory Hayes, and Jay Kinney.

Issue guide

References

External links
 

1970 comics debuts
1983 comics endings
Underground comix
Comics anthologies
San Francisco Bay Area literature